Pregnant patients rights refers to the choices and legal rights available to a woman experiencing pregnancy or childbirth. Specifically those under medical care within a medical establishment or those under the care of a medical professional regardless of location ( under care of paramedics at home, family doctor via phone, etc. ).

There are many debates that arise from pregnancy rights, ranging from whether or not fertility treatments are 'right' or whether using surrogate mothers is wrong. It comes down to the mother's right. As a woman, there are more challenges than just the fundamentals of the decisions surrounding their pregnancy. Maternity leave, parental leave and the time allotted for these leaves varies from company to company.

The International Conference on Population and Development (ICPD) gathered in Cairo in September 1994 to discuss and "formulate a consensus position on population and development for the next 20 years". One of the other goals was to make education and medical services available to women while they are pregnant, and when the time comes, have delivery options available. A main concern has always been postnatal care; people think that the hardest part is the birth of the child but there are so many additional concerns once the child is born and brought into this world. Complications both prior to pregnancy, during delivery, and after delivery are a potential concern in all births, the ICPD talked about enhancing the available support for all women. Pregnancy rights throughout the world are not going to be the same in every single place but the ICPD is aiming to eliminate discrimination during pregnancy and make all pregnant patients' rights available to everyone.

Nurses and patients sometimes run into troubles because their opinions will often vary in what they think should be done in terms of termination or pre/post natal care.  As Kane, 2009 states "The NMC code of professional conduct states that: 'you must make the care of people your first concern'" enforcing that the nurses opinions really should be kept to themselves so as to not influence the decision of the patients.

Rights in Australia 
In Australia pregnant women have the same rights as any other member of society. However, they do have some extra rights when it comes to their rights in the workforce.

Pregnant women' rights in the workforce 
Under the Fair Work Act 2009 section  pregnant women are still entitled to the same amount of sick leave as any other individual as being pregnant does not classify as an illness. A Pregnant woman however is able to take unpaid leave for "special maternity leave", this is maternity leave that she can take if she has a pregnancy related illness or the pregnancy ends any time after the first trimester due to a miscarriage, a stillbirth or a termination.

Safe jobs is when the women moves to a safer job while being because her original job is dangerous to her and the baby. She will need to provide evidence that she can still work but unable to perform the original tasks and how long she shouldn't work in her job for. An example for proving these would be with a medical certificate. In the circumstances where there is no safer jobs to offer the women can take no safe jobs leave. The employee takes paid leave if she is entitled to unpaid parental leave and unpaid leave if she is not.

Discrimination in the workforce against pregnant women is illegal. This means that she can not be fired, lose hours, demoted and treated differently because of her pregnancy.

Terminating the pregnancy 
In Australia the laws on termination change between each state and territory. In Western Australia termination is considered lawful up until 20 weeks of pregnancy. A termination after 20 weeks can only be undertaken if there is two medical practitioners from a panel of six that agree that the women or the fetus has or will have a serious medical condition if the pregnancy continued.

Immunisation 
During pregnancy, women have the right to seek getting immunised with the influenza vaccine ("Flu Shot") and the adult dTpa vaccine (pertussis). Both of these vaccines are recommended; however, it is up to the individual whether or not to go ahead with the vaccinations.

References
5. Federal Register of Legislation. (2009). Fair Work act. Retrieved from https://www.legislation.gov.au/Details/C2016C00332

6. Federal Register of Legislation. (2003). Sex Discrimination Amendment (pregnancy and work) act. Retrieved from                                                                                        https://www.legislation.gov.au/Details/C2004A01186

7. Parliament of Australia.(1998). Abortion law in Australia. Retrieved from http://www.aph.gov.au/About_Parliament/Parliamentary_Departments/Parliamentary_Library/pubs/rp/rp9899/99rp01

8. Australian Government Department of Health. (2015) Immunise Australia Program. Retrieved from http://www.immunise.health.gov.au/internet/immunise/publishing.nsf/Content/pregnant-women

Maternity in Australia
Health law
Women's rights
Midwifery